The Tom and Jerry Spotlight Collection is a series of two-disc DVD sets released by Warner Home Video. Originally planned as an uncensored, chronological set, the issued Spotlight Collection sets include selected Tom and Jerry shorts on each volume. Volume 1 was released on October 19, 2004, Volume 2 on October 25, 2005, and the third and final volume on September 11, 2007. On October 15, 2019, the set, which consists of 4 discs, was repackaged with some errors fixed.

Contents 
The following 113 shorts were directed by William Hanna and Joseph Barbera at the Metro-Goldwyn-Mayer cartoon studio in Hollywood, California. All shorts were released to theaters by Metro-Goldwyn-Mayer between 1940 and 1958. The original MGM Hanna-Barbera classics are a total of 114 shorts.

Spotlight Collection 
A superscripted one ( 1 ) denotes cartoons presented in the CinemaScope aspect ratio using a new anamorphic widescreen transfer.

Disc 1 
Disc one contains shorts from the 1940s.
 The Yankee Doodle Mouse
 Sufferin' Cats!
 Baby Puss
 The Zoot Cat
 The Million Dollar Cat
 The Bodyguard
 Mouse Trouble
 Tee for Two
 Flirty Birdy
 Quiet Please!
 The Milky Waif
 Solid Serenade
 Cat Fishin'
 The Cat Concerto
 Kitty Foiled
 The Truce Hurts
 Salt Water Tabby
 The Invisible Mouse
 The Little Orphan
 Heavenly Puss

Disc 2 
Disc 2 contains shorts from the 1950s.
 Texas Tom
 Jerry and the Lion
 Tom and Jerry in the Hollywood Bowl
 Jerry and the Goldfish
 Cue Ball Cat
 Slicked-up Pup
 Jerry's Cousin
 Cat Napping
 The Flying Cat
 The Two Mouseketeers
 Smitten Kitten
 Johann Mouse
 Two Little Indians
 Baby Butch
 Mice Follies
 Designs on Jerry
 Pecos Pest
 Touché, Pussy Cat! 1
 The Flying Sorceress 1
 Blue Cat Blues 1

Bonus features 
 Commentary by Jerry Beck on: The Zoot Cat, Kitty Foiled, and Heavenly Puss
 "Behind the Tunes: The MGM Orchestra" (documentary on the music of Tom and Jerry)
 "How Bill and Joe Met Tom and Jerry" (documentary on the origin of the series)
 Jerry Dances with Gene Kelly (excerpt from Anchors Aweigh)
 Tom and Jerry Swim with Esther Williams (excerpt from Dangerous When Wet)

Spotlight Collection, Vol. 2 

A superscripted one ( 1 ) denotes cartoons in the standard Academy ratio presented in newly remastered versions. A superscripted two ( 2 ) denotes cartoons presented in the CinemaScope aspect ratio using a new anamorphic widescreen transfer.

Disc 1 
Disc 1 contains shorts from the 1940s.
 Puss Gets the Boot 1
 The Midnight Snack 1
 The Night Before Christmas
 Fraidy Cat 1
 Dog Trouble 1
 Puss n' Toots 1
 The Bowling Alley Cat
 Fine Feathered Friend
 The Lonesome Mouse
 Puttin' on the Dog
 The Mouse Comes to Dinner
 Mouse in Manhattan
 Springtime for Thomas
 Trap Happy
 Part Time Pal
 Dr. Jekyll and Mr. Mouse
 Old Rockin' Chair Tom
 Professor Tom
 The Cat and the Mermouse
 Polka-Dot Puss

Disc 2 
Disc two contains shorts from the 1950s.
 Saturday Evening Puss
 Little Quacker
 Texas Tom (repeat)
 Safety Second
 Sleepy-Time Tom
 Nit-Witty Kitty
 Cruise Cat
 Triplet Trouble
 Push-Button Kitty
 The Missing Mouse
 Jerry and Jumbo
 Just Ducky
 Little School Mouse
 Tom and Chérie
 Muscle Beach Tom
 Down Beat Bear
 Mucho Mouse
 Tot Watchers

Bonus features 
 An introduction by Whoopi Goldberg where Goldberg explains that the Tom and Jerry cartoons may contain racial stereotyping (particularly centered on the appearance of Mammy Two-Shoes) that may offend some modern-day viewers. A similar introduction is in the third volume of the Looney Tunes Golden Collection.
 Commentary tracks on Puss Gets the Boot, The Night Before Christmas, Dr. Jekyll and Mr. Mouse, and Saturday Evening Puss by MADtv castmember Nicole Parker and animation historian Earl Kress
 "Animators as Actors": Actor's workshop of where the inspiration for character personalities come from
 "The Comedy Stylings of Tom and Jerry" (featuring appearances by Mark Kausler, Jerry Beck, and MADtv castmembers Nicole Parker and Ike Barinholtz)
 "Silent Pencil Sketch: 'The Midnight Snack'"

Spotlight Collection, Vol. 3 

Vol. 3 completes the Hanna-Barbera Tom and Jerry cartoons, save for Mouse Cleaning and Casanova Cat. According to a Warner Home Video press release, these cartoons were omitted from the set for racial stereotyping. (These cartoons are presented uncut on the European PAL DVD set Tom and Jerry: The Classic Collection, with Mouse Cleaning appearing on Vol. 2 and Casanova Cat appearing on Vol. 3 of that series.)

Disc 1 
Disc one contains non-CinemaScope shorts.
 A Mouse in the House
 Hatch Up Your Troubles
 Love That Pup
 Jerry's Diary
 Tennis Chumps
 The Framed Cat
 His Mouse Friday (Edited)
 The Duck Doctor
 Little Runaway
 Fit to Be Tied
 The Dog House
 That's My Pup!
 Life with Tom
 Puppy Tale
 Posse Cat
 Hic-cup Pup
 Downhearted Duckling
 Neapolitan Mouse
 Mouse for Sale
 Smarty Cat

Disc 2 
Disc two contains shorts presented in the CinemaScope format.
 Pet Peeve
 Southbound Duckling
 Pup on a Picnic
 That's My Mommy
 The Egg and Jerry
 Busy Buddies
 Barbecue Brawl
 Tops with Pops
 Timid Tabby
 Feedin' the Kiddie
 Tom's Photo Finish
 Happy Go Ducky
 Royal Cat Nap
 The Vanishing Duck
 Robin Hoodwinked

Bonus features 
 "Cat and Mouse: The Tale of Tom and Jerry": a documentary on the history of the Tom and Jerry shorts, and the censorship issues the series has had to deal with.
 The Karate Guard, a 2005 Tom and Jerry short directed by co-creator Joseph Barbera.

Censorship
The Tom and Jerry Spotlight Collection sets contain shorts that have been altered from their original versions. 

The first volume contains three shorts (The Milky Waif, The Truce Hurts, and The Little Orphan) that initially included depictions of blackface in the 2004 release. Warner corrected this through a disc replacement program, which began in 2006.

The second volume contains four shorts (The Lonesome Mouse, Polka-Dot Puss, Saturday Evening Puss and Nit-Witty Kitty) with edited sound tracks. These four shorts contained a redubbed Mammy Two Shoes audio track, instead of the original. Similarly to the first volume, Warner instated a disc replacement program, and later reprints contain the original Mammy Two Shoes tracks.

The final volume contains an edited version of His Mouse Friday (1951). The shorts Mouse Cleaning (1948) and Casanova Cat (1951) were omitted from the set due to their inappropriate racial stereotypes, according to a statement from Warner Home Video. These two shorts were the only original Tom and Jerry shorts not present in the Spotlight Collection series, however, the two shorts are on the European Classic Collection.

See also 
 Tom and Jerry Golden Collection
 Tom and Jerry: The Chuck Jones Collection
 Tom and Jerry: The Gene Deitch Collection

References 

Tom and Jerry
Warner Bros. home video releases